Bembidion cheyennense is a species of beetle in the family Carabidae. It is found in North America.

References

cheyennense
Beetles described in 1918